Mohamed Abdel Monsef (born 6 February 1977) is an Egyptian professional footballer.

Career
Abdel Monsef started his career with Dina Farms, then he played for Zamalek for eleven years. Later on, he joined El Gouna, Al Ittihad, ENPPI and Wadi Degla. On 24 September 2020, he celebrated his 400th match in the Egyptian Premier League.

References

External links

1977 births
Living people
Zamalek SC players
El Gouna FC players
Al Ittihad Alexandria Club players
ENPPI SC players
Wadi Degla SC players
Egyptian footballers
Egypt international footballers
2006 Africa Cup of Nations players
2008 Africa Cup of Nations players
2002 African Cup of Nations players
Egyptian Premier League players
Association football goalkeepers